Germanic given names are traditionally dithematic; that is, they are formed from two elements, by joining a prefix and a suffix.

However, there are also names dating from an early time which seem to be monothematic, consisting only of a single element. These are sometimes explained as hypocorisms, short forms of originally dithematic names, but in many cases the etymology of the supposed original name cannot be recovered.

The oldest known Germanic names date to the Roman Empire period, such as those of Arminius and his wife Thusnelda in the 1st century, and in greater frequency, especially Gothic names, in the late Roman Empire, in the 4th to 5th centuries (the Germanic Heroic Age).

A great variety of names are attested from the medieval period, falling into the rough categories of Scandinavian (Old Norse), Anglo-Saxon (Old English), continental (Frankish, Old High German and Low German), and East Germanic (see Gothic names) forms.

By the High Middle Ages, many of these names had undergone numerous sound changes and/or were abbreviated, so that their derivation is not always clear.

Of the large number of medieval Germanic names, a comparatively small set remains in common use today. In modern times, the most frequent name of Germanic origin in the English-speaking world has traditionally been William (from an Old High German ), followed by Robert and Charles (Carl, after Charlemagne).

Some names, like Howard and Ronald, are thought to originate from multiple Germanic languages, including Anglo-Saxon.

Dithematic names

{|class="wikitable sortable"
!Element!!Meaning!!Prefix!!Suffix!!Examples!!Notes
|-
|act, aht, oht || fearsome(?) ||  || || Ohthere, Ohtrad, Actumerus, Octric,  Actulf; Actohildis, Octolindis || Pokorny suggests rather the root of OHG āhta `hostile pursuit', Germ.. Acht, OE. ōht 'pursuit, harassment'< *anhtō, in OE conflated with ōht 'terror', from the preterite of ag- "fear". These represent perhaps two or more roots which are indistinguishable without
|-
| *agi-; eg, ecg, egg, ekk, agin, egin || sword, blade |||| || Egbert, Ecgbald, Eggert, Ecgwine, Ekkehart, Ecgric, Eginolf; Ecgwynn, Egon || Some names in ag-, eg- may be unrelated in origin; see Förstemann, 9.
|-
|agil, ail, eil ||dread or weapon edge || || ||  Agilperht, Agilfrid, Agilulf, Egilger, Agilmar/Ilmar/Elmar, Egil, Egilrat; Alruna, Agilburgis,  || Uncertain etymology; like agin perhaps a hypostatis of the older ag-;   Förstemann, 22. See Agilaz.
|-
|ala || all  || || ||Alafrid, Alager, Alamunt, Alarad, Alaric, Alaruna, Alasuind || Some names in ala- have this etymology; others are corruptions of names in aþal-.  Förstemann, 39.
|-
|ald, eald || old ||  || — || Altopold, Altiperht, Aldfrid/Aldfrith, Aldegar, Aldman, Ealdred/Aldred, Aldwig, Aldwin/Audoin/Alduin, Ealdwulf/Aldwulf; Aldedrudis, Aldeberga/Aldburg, Aldigart, Altagund, Aldelindis, Aldis
|-
| *albi-; ælf, elf, alf  || elf |||| —|| Ælfwine, Ælfric, Alfred, Ælfweard, Ælfsige; Ælfflæd, Ælfwaru, Ælfwynn
|-
|| *alh, alah, ealh || hall, temple ||  || || Ealhhelm, Ealhmund/Alcmund, Alhred, Ealhwine/Alcuin; Ealhswith, Ælgifu(?) || Perhaps related to runic alu|-
|amala || work(?) ||  || || Amaleberga, Amalafrida, Amalrica, Amalaswintha/Melisende/Millicent || c.f. Amalia, Amelie. This element's etymology is uncertain, but it is frequently compared to Old Norse aml "work".
|-
|angil, engel; ingal/ingel || a tribal name ||  || || Angilbald, Angilberht/Engelbert, Engilfrit, Angalgar, Angilhelm/Ingelhelm, Engilhoh; (Ingalberta), Angilburga, Angildruda, Engilgund || Names in angil- may arise with Christianization, by conflation with the prefix ingal-, an extension of the theophoric ing- prefix; see Förstemann, 89.
|-
|| *aþal-, adall, æthel||   noble |||| ||   Æthelhard, Æthelred, Adolf/Æthelwulf, Alphonse, Albert/Adelbert, Adelbrand/Alebrand, Æthelburh, Adelaide, Æthelstan, Æthelflæd, Adalsinda, Adelmar, Æthelthryth/Audrey, Aðils, Æthelgifu || see ethel, odal, 
|-
|| *anô-, ON anu or ái, OHG ano || ancestor |||| (?) || Olaf || Hypocorisms Ole, Åke/Åge
|-
|| *ans-, ON ás, OHG ans, AS os || god ||||— || Oscar, Oswin, Oswald/Ansaldo, Ansgar, Anselm, Ansleth, Ásleikr/Anslech/Oslac, Ansfridus, Anshelmus/Anselm, Ansgisus, Ansbrecht, Answald; Osburh, Osgyth, Osthryth
|-
|ar, ara, ari, arni, earn || eagle ||  ||  ||Arafrid, Aramund, Arswind, Arfrid, Arnipert, Arnold, Arnulf, Arvid ||Many of these names cannot be distinguished with certainty from the corresponding name in hari-.
|-
|arb, erb, erf || inheritance ||  || — || Arbogastis, Erbhart, Erphari, Erpolach, Erflind, Erbemar, Erpmund, Erferat, Erferih, Erpwin, Erpulf || Hypocorisms Aribo, Erbo
|-
|asc, æsc || ash, spear (made of ash tree) ||  || || Askold, Aschari, Asclind, Ascarich, Ascwin, Asculf ||c.f. Oisc, Ask
|-
|*audaz, aud,  od, euþ, auþ, euth, ead, eod, jóð|| wealth, prosperity ||  || || Audeca, Audofleda, Auduin, Odotheus, Audovacar/Odoacer, Odomir/Otmar/Ottomar/Othmar/Ademar, Edgar/Audagar/Ottokar, Edmund, Eadnoth, Eadred/Edred, Edward, Eadwig, Eadwulf, Edwin, Eadgifu, Edith. Eadgils (etc.) || Extremely frequent. c.f. also Ethel, Otto, Odda, Auðr
|-
|aun, on,  ean || ? ||  || || Eanhere, Aunefrit/Eanfrith, Aunemund, Onerich, Aunulf; Eanflæd || Possibly "one" due to vowel being pronounced farther back in the mouth. At the time, and given those bearing the name, slowly becoming Old English "an", meaning "one'. But officially the etymology is unknown; see Förstemann, 181.
|-
|aus, aust, eost || radiant; a goddess ||  || || Auripert, Aurendil/Orendil/Aurvandil, Aurulf; Ostheri, Austrad, Austrobert, Austraberta, Ostarpurc, Aostarger, Aostargart, Austrigisil, Ostarhilt, Ostremund, Austrad, Australd, Ostruin, Austrulf  || Possibly theophoric, see Eostre, Aurvandil
|-
| bald ||  bold   || || || Baldwin; Theobald, Ubaldo, etc. || Very frequent, and often conflated with the wald element.
|-
|| band || band, loop || || ?|| Pandulf/Pandolfo
|-
|baud, bad, bud, badu, beadu, both || battle? || ||  || Baudigisil, Baudegund, Baudemund, Baudulf, Beadohild, Beaduhelm, Beaduwine, Bothvildr || Uncertain etymology; mostly in old names (before the 8th century)  Förstemann, 216f. In later use indistinguishable from bald|-
|baug || ring ||  || || Baugegundus, Bauglind, Baugulf
|-
| *berht-; beraht, bryht, briht || bright |||||| Byrhtnoth, Bertrand, Bertram, Bertold/Berthold, Beorhtric, Bertrude, Brihtwyn; Cuthbert, Aribert, Albert/Albright/Adelbert, Rigobert, Robert/Rupert, Herbert, Humbert, Hubert, Norbert, Wilbert, Delbert/Dagobert, Engelbert, Egbert, Lambert, Sindbert, Bertstan, Lubbert, Ludbert, Wolfbert||hypocorism Bert. One of the most frequent elements, but not attested before the 6th century.
|-
|| burg, beorg || fortress || || || Burchard/Burkhart, Burgred; Cuthburh, Eadburh, Æthelburh, Osburh, Redburga, Seaxburh, Walpurga, Werburgh || The suffix is feminine only. See also Burke
|-
| bera, bern, berin, beorn || bear || || || Berengar, Berahart/Bernhard, Berhildis, Berahoch, Bermar, Berimund, Beornwulf || cf. Beonna, Berig
|-
|bil || blade, sword ||  || || Biligrim, Bilihelm, Bilihild, Billfrith, Belimar, Bilidruda, Pilolf || among the Saxons often monothematic, as Bilo, Pilicho, Pillin, Billung
|-
|blic || lightning |||| || Blictrud, Blicger, Blicgart, Plechelm, Blicildis
|-
|blid || blithe ||  || || Bliddruda, Bllithar, Blithelm, Blidhild, Blidmar, Blidulf, Blidemund, Plittelmi
|-
|bord || shield || — ||  || Herebord, Hiltiport, Saelbort, Willipord
|-
| brand ||  fire, as a kenning for "sword"  || || || Branthildis, Branthoc, Brandulf; Adelbrand, Gerbrand, Hildebrand, Hadubrand, IJsbrand, Theudebrand || cf. Brant. Attested from the 7th century, with the exception of Gothic Brandila
|-
| brun || armour, protection; brown  ||  || || Brunfrid, Brunger, Brunric, Brunward, Brunulf/Brynolf/Brunolf/Brynjolfr/Brunulphe; Brunhild; Adalbrun, Hiltibrun, Liefbrun, Liutbrun. || The words for "armour" and for "brown" are unrelated, but a distinction of these two elements is impossible.
|-
|dag, tag || day ||  || || Tagapald/Dacbold, Dagaperht/Dagobert, Tachiprand, Dagafrid, Dachelm, Tagarat/Dagred, Dagaric, Dagewin, Dagaulf; Alfdag, Osdag, Heridag, Helmdag, Hildidag, Hroddag, Wendildag,  Wulfdag, || Possibly a conflation of several roots, perhaps brightness, day, and a loan of Celtic dago "good".
|-
|dis, idis || lady || ||||Dissibod, Disnot ||Names with this prefix are probably theophoric. In Nordic feminine names with the suffix -dis, the meaning is "woman".
|-
|diur, deor ||animal ||  ||  ||Deurtrudis, Thiurhilt, Deorold, Deorulf ||The meaning of this element may be either "animal" (deer) or "dear". See also Deor.
|-
|dom || judgement (doom) ||  || ? || Dombert, Domedrudis, Domegerdis, Domalde, Duomolf
|-
|druht, droc, druc || people ||  || || Droctbold, Drocberta, Drutberga, Drucfred, Druhtgang, Truhthari, Droctelm, Dructildis, Druhtmar, Dructimund, Dructuin, Dructulf
|-
|ebur, eber, eofor || boar || || ||  Eparpert/Everbert, Eureberga, Euurdag, Ebertrudis, Eparfrid, Eberger, Eberhard/Eoforheard/Everard/Everett, Ebarhelm, Eburhilt, Ebirmuot, Ebermunt, Ebarolt, Eberwin/Ebroin, Eberulf, Eboric
|-
|era, eri, erin, ern || honour ||  || ||Erarich, Eranbald, Erambert, Ernulf || Probably a genuine element, but difficult to distinguish from hari, which is also often reduced to eri-, er-, or from ari, arni. The form erin-, on the other hand,  is often conflated with the irm- element.
|-
|ercan, erchen, archen, eorcen || pure, genuine ||  || || Ercanberaht/Eorcenberht, Ercanbold/Archibald, Ercamberta, Ercanpurh, Ercantrud, Ercanfrid, Ercangar, Ercanhilt, Erchensinda, Erchinoald/Erchanold, Archanolf/Erchenulf || Förstemann, 377 connects OGH ercan "sublime, pure, holy" (the general sense in Gothic as well). In OE and ON used in compounds designating various "precious" stones. Perhaps theophoric, from a name of Teiwaz.
|-
|erl, eorl || warrior, noble || || || Erlabald/Erlembald, Erlefrida, Erligar, Erlemund, Erlwin, Erlulf || Pokorny suggests a tentative link with ari-, arni- "eagle", an 'l' suffix form of which is found in the Balto-Slavic languages.
|-
|ewa, ew, eu, eo || ever ||  || || Euin, Eubert, Eomar, Eumund, Ewirat, Eric, Eowig, Eolf
|-
|far, fara; fart, fard || journey, travel ||  || || Farabert, Faregar, Feriher, Farohildis, Ferlinda, Faraman, Faramod, Faramund, Faroald, Faruin, Faraulf, Farnulf; Farthilt, Fartman, Ferdinand, Fardulf, ; Adalfer, Leobafar, Sicfara, Theudifara ||
|-
|fast || firm, fast ||  || —|| Fastburg, Fastrada, Fastrih, Fastwin, Fastulf
|-
|fili || much, many(?) ||  ||  || Filibert, Feologild?, Filuliub, Filomar, Filomuot
|-
|| *friþu-; ON friþ, OHG fridu || protection, peace ||||||Fredegar, Ferdinand, Fredegund/Frithugyth, Friedrich/Frederick, Frithuwold, Fridthjof; Billfrith, Dietfried, Ermenfrid, Godfried, Gottfried, Sigfrid/Siegfried, Walfrid/Walfried, Ecgfrida
|In Old English, used almost exclusively for male names; Ecgfriþ is noted exception
|-
| flad, flæð  || purity, glory, beauty  ||  || || Fladebert, Flatberta, Flatberga, Fladrudis, Fledrad, Flidulf; Albofledis/Ælfflæd, Ansfledis, Audofleda/Aethelflaed, Berhtflat, Burgofledis, Druhtflat, Ermenfleda, Gerflat, Gundiflat, Hrotflat, Ratflad, Sigiflat, Wynflæd || The suffix is feminine only.
|-
|fram || spear, javelin || || || Frambold, Frambert, Framsindis, Franemund, Franswinda || Almost exclusively Frankish names
|-
|franc || a tribal name ||  || || Francobert, Frangomere, Franchrih
|-
|fraw, fro, frea; fri || lord |||| || Frowin, Frawibald, Frawiprecht, Frawihilt, Frowimund, Frowini, Frauirat, Frawisinda, Freawaru; Friher, Frehild, Friulf || c.f. Fróði; theophoric (see Fraujaz, Frijjō).
|-
|frig, freh || bold || || || Frigobert, Frehholt, Friculf
|-
| frod || wise, prudent ||  || || Frotbald, Frodobert, Frotfar, Frotfrid, Frodegard, Frothard, Frotland, Frotmir, Frotmund, Frodwin, Frodulf || hypocorisms Frodo, Frutilo, Frodin
|-
|frum || good, beneficial ||  || || Frumiger, Frumihilt, Frumirat, Frumirih, Frumold, Frumolf, Frumar
|-
|fulc, folc, volc || people, folk ||  || || Folcbald, Forlberaht/Volcbert, Fulcdag, Folhker/Folcger, Folchard, Fulchar/Volker, Volkhard, Fikcgzbm Folcleih,  Fulclindis,  Folcman, Folcmar/Volkmar, Folcnand, Fulcrad, Fulcrich, Folcswind, Fulcuald, Folcward, Folcwin, Fulculf; Heidifolc, Herifolch, Hrodfolc, Ratfolc, Sigifolc, Saelfolc
|-
|funs, fús || eager, brave || — ||  || Amdefuns, Adalfuns/Alphonse, Bernefons, Hadufuns, Sigifuns, Valafons
|-
|gail, gel || gay, merry|| || — || Gelbold, Geilindis, Geilamir, Gailswindis, Geilwib, Geilwih, 
||hypocorism Gailo, Geliko
|-
|gamal, gam || old ||  || — || Gamalbold, Gamalbert, Gamalberga,  Gamaltrudis,  Gamalfred, Gamalher, Camalrat, 
|-
|gaman || joy ||  || || Gamanhilt, Gamanolt,  Gamanulf || Only Old High German, rare
|-
| gan || magic ||  ||  ||  Gannibald, Ganefard, Ganhart ; Adalgan, Audiganus, Morgan, Wolfgan
|-
|gand, gend || ? ||  ||  || Gantberga, Gentfrid, Ganthar/Ganther, Gendrad, Gandaricus, Gandulf  ; Gredegand, Charigand, Hrodogand, Gislegendis || Hypocorisms Gando, Gantalo, Gandin; cf. Gandalfr (mythological)
|-
|gang || path, journey ||  ||  || Gangperht, Gangolf; Bertegang, Druhtgang, Hildigang, Hrodegang, Thiotcanc, Uligang, Widugang, Wiligang, Wolfgang
|-
| gar, ger,  earlier gais|| spear  |||| || Gerald, Gerhard/Gerard, Gerbrand, Gerwin, German; Berengar, Edgar, Oscar, Hrothgar/Roger|| hypocorism Gero, Gerry. Very frequent both as prefix and as suffix. Gerðr is the wife of Freyr in Norse mythology.
|-
| gard  ||  enclosure ||  || ||Gardrad, Gardulf; Hildegard, Irmgard, Liutgart, Richardis, etc. || Rare as a prefix, very frequent as a suffix. The great majority of names with this suffix are feminine. 
|-
|gast || guest; spirit ||  ||  ||  Castald, Gestilind, Gestiliub, Gastrad; Altgast, Alpkast, Andragast, Arbogast, Cunigast, Hartigast, Hiltigast, Hungast, Lindigast, Milgast, Nebiogast, Salagast, Suabgast, Widogast, Visogast || Mostly as suffix; frequent in early (3rd to 4th centuries) names; frequent conflation with Slavic names (Radegast, Gustaph).
|-
|gaud, gaut, gaus, got, goz || a tribal name ||  ||  ||Gauzebald/Cozpolt/Gausbolda, Gaucibert/Gozperaht, Gauseprand, Gausburgis, Gauttrudis, Caozflat, Gautfred, Gozger, Gauter/Kozheri, Gautastabaz/Göstaf/Gösta/Gustav, Gautshelm, Gauthildis, Gozleih, Gautlindis, Gautrekr, Goswin/Gaudoin, Gaudulf; Algaut, Amalgaud, Ansegaud, Ariugaud, Ostgaus/Aostargaoz, Berengaud, Danegaud, Trutgaud, Ebregaud, Ercangaud, Erlegaud, Faregaud, Gisalgoz, Helmigaud, Hildegaud,  Hohgaud,  Hungoz,  Irmegaus, Ermengaud, Teutgaud, Ulgaud,  Waldegaud, Wihgoz, Vuldargoza. || The tribal name of the Geats/Goths. Hypocorisms Gaudo, Gaudila, Gauzilin, Gaudin. These names are popular during the 6th to 11th centuries. The forms in got are difficult to distinguish from the element god "god".
|-
| geld, gild; gold || worthy; gold, payment, yield ||  ||  ||  Giltbert, Gelther, Gildemir, Giltrada,  Geldirih, Goldrun, Geltwif, Geltwig, Gildewin, Geldulf; Amalgaldis, Ausigildis, Adalgildis, Athanagild, Beregildis, Bertegildis, Trutgildis,  Faregildis, Framengildis, Fredegildis,  Frotgiliis, Gislegildis, Herigilid, Hleokelt, Lantegildis,  Rihgelt, Sparagildis, Teutgildis, Wandegildis, Witgildis, Wolfgelt, etc. || Hypocorisms Gildo, Gilting, Coldin, Gilticho
|-
| gifu; geb, gib || gift  ||  || ||   Gibbold, Gibborga, Gibitrudis, Giffrid, Gebhard, Gebaheri, Gibohildis, Gebahoh, Gebalinda, Geberad, Geberic, Gebawin,  Gibulf;   Ælgifu/Ælfgifu, Ælthelgifu/Eadgifu, Godgyfu/Godiva, Ottogeba, Thialgif, Willigip  || hypocorisms Gabilo, Gibilin, Gebi, Gabo, Gibicho, etc.
|-
| gisil, gisel || hostage, pledge || || || Giselbert,  Giselric, Giselhard; Giselberga || Hypocorism Gisela, cf. Giselle 
|-
| glis || gleam || || || Glismot, Glisnot ||
|-
| god, got || god; good ||  || || Godfrid/Godfrey, Godscalc, Gothard, Gotwald || In most cases, the etymologies guda "deus" and goda "bonus" cannot be distinguished with certainty, while in older continental names this is often an alternative form of Gund 
|-
| graus || horror, terror ||  || || Crosmuat (8th century), Grausolph (9th century) || simplex Grauso, Chroso, Cros, Kros, etc.; 
|-
| graw, gra || grey ||  || || Graobart, Grahilt (8th century), Graman (8th century), Graulf (8th century) ||
|-
| grim || helmet, mask ||  ||  || Grimwald, Grimoald, Grimhild/Krimhild/Kriemhild; Isegrim/Isengrim
|-
| guma || man ||  || || Gomadrudis, Gomoharius, Gomahilt, Gomaleih, Gomlinda, Gumemar, Gumarich, Gumesind, Gumoalt, Gomolf
|-
|*gunþ-; gund, gud, gyþ, gyð || battle, war ||||||Günther/Gunther/Gunter/Guntar/Gundar, Gundoald, Gundulf, Gunnhild, Gudrun; Eadgyð, Ealdgyð/Edith, Fredegund/Frithugyth, Sigith/Sigita, Hildegund/Hildegunn, Rigunth
|-
| hag, hagan; hah ||enclosure, yard ||  || || Hagibert, Hagihar, Hachirat, Hagoald, Hagiwolf; Hahger, Hahmund, Hahwart, Haholf ||  Attested from the 7th century in forms such as Hago,  Chaino etc. From an early time conflated with names in Ag-, Agin-. See also Haguna.
|-
| haid, heit ||  rank, state  || || || Haidrich, Heidfolc, Chaideruna; Adelaide etc. || Extremely frequent as second element in feminine names (83 listed by Förstemann), apparently due to early confusion with similar words for heath. 
|-
| hail, heil; hailag || whole, healthy ||  || || Hailbert, Hailun, Hailburch, Hailtruda, Heilan, Heilmunt, Hailrat, Hailwin; Halagmund, Halegred, ; Rihheil, Sarahailo || Hailo, Halicho (8th century); conflated with the elements agil and hal.
|-
| *haim-; OHG haim, heim, AS hæm ||  home |||| || Henry/Heinrich, Heimwart || hypocorism Haimo
|-
|haist, heist || furious, violent(?) |||| || Haisthilt, Haistulf, Hailun || c.f. Old English ; also compared with the tribal name of the Aesti.
|-
| hamar || hammer |||| || Hamerard, Hamarolf, Hamarbert || Rare; limited to a handful of names of the 8th century.
|-
|hand || hand(?) |||| || Hantbert, Hantker,  Handegis, Hantwin, Handolf || Rare, 8th and 9th centuries.
|-
|harc || altar(?) |||| || Harcmot, Hercrat, Harchellindis (f.), Horcholt || rare, 9th and 10th centuries;  c.f. the entries under ercan.
|-
| hard, heard || brave, hardy ||  |||| Hartman, Hartmut (etc.); Æthelhard, Richard, Gerhard, Gotthard, Bernard/Bernhard (etc.) || Very frequent, recorded from as early as the 3rd century.
|-
| *hari, her || army  ||||||Diether, Luther, Hereweald/Harold, Herbert, Herleif, Herman/Arminius, Ariovistus, Ariouualdus || hypocorism Harry, Walther; Heri(?). Very frequent, Förstemann lists 289 names with -hari as second element. As first element recorded as early as the 1st century (in Chariovalda), or possibly in the 1st century BC (Negau helmet B, Harigasti) 
|-
| hath, had, hada, hadu || battle, combat |||| || Hadubrand, Hadufuns, Hedwig; Rihhad, Willihad, Wolfhad, Vunnihad || Frequent, from the 6th century, formally indistinguishable from haid.
|-
|hedan, haidan || heathen, pagan || || || Hedenold, Hedenulf ; Wolfhetan || rare; 7th to 9th centuries.
|-
| helm ||  protector  || || || Helmut, Helmdrud, Helmfrid; Diethelm, Ealhhelm, Anselm, Cwichelm, Nothhelm, Wilhelm/William || Hypocorism Helmo. Comparatively frequent from the 6th century.
|-
|heah, hoch || high || || || Heaberht, Hámundr|| cf. Huoching/Haki
|-
| hild- || war  |||||| Actohildis, Berhildis, Branthildis, Brunhild, Farohildis, Ermenhild/Imelda, Gauthildis/Gauthildr, Gerhild, Gibohildis, Grimhild/Krimhild/Kriemhild, Gunnhild, Matilda, Judelhildis, Landohildis, Nanthild, Richilda, Wanthildis; Childebert, Hildebrand, Hildegard, Hildegund/Hildegunn (etc.) || One of the most frequently used stems both as prefix and as suffix, attested since the 3rd century. Among the Franks its use especially for feminine names is "almost excessive" according to Förstemann, who counts 281 names with this suffix, of which only four are masculine. Hypocorism Hilda.
|-
|hilp, help ||aid, help ||  || — || Chilperic, Helpoald, Helpuin, Helpwolf || rare; Chilperic is from the 5th century, other names with this element occur only in the 8th and 9th centuries.
|-
|*heltą, hilt, hilz, helz || hilt ||   || —|| Hilcekin, Helzuni, Helzolt || rare; 8th to 11th centuries
|-
| || heaven ||   || || Himildrud,  Himilger, Himilrad || rare, 8th to 10th centuries.
|-
|hir-/heru || sword ||   ||  || Hiring, Hiribert, Hirburc, Hiriger, Hiriward || 9th century;  Gothic hairus, Anglo-Saxon heoro- "sword", also in the tribal name of the Cherusci. 
|-
|, hiriz, herz || hart, stag ||  || || Hirizpero, Herzrad(?); dim. Hirzula  || rare
|-
| hleo ||  protection |||| || Hleoperht, Hlevagastir
|-
| , hloda ||  fame |||| || Hlothhere, Chlodwig/Ludwig/Louis, Ludolf, Lothar/Chlothar/Lothaire, Chlodomir; Chlodoswintha
|-
| hog, huog ||  dexterous, nimble(?) |||| ||  Huogobert, Huoging, Huogulf, Hogo 
|-
| hol ||  crafty, devious(?) |||| ||  Holebert, Holomot, Holemund, Holosint
|-
| hord, hort ||  hoard, treasure |||| ||  Hortbert, Horthari, Hordold, Hordward, Horduin, Hordolf
|-
| hraban, hram ||  raven ||   || ||  Bertram, Wolfram
| frequent in the 7th to 9th centuries; surely from the ravens of Wodanaz originally (as was wulf-). Förestemann counts 125 masculine and 15 feminine with this suffix. The simplex Hraban (and variants) is recorded from the 6th century. The Gothic name Valarauans  if it contains this root would be the oldest record of the element (4th century). 
|-
| hrad ||  quick, fast  ||  || (?)||  Hradperaht, Hradpurh, Hradgast, Hrathari, Hradwin ||
|-
|  hraid, hreid || famous(?)  ||  || || Hreiðmarr, Hreidperaht, Hreidgaer, Hreitolf, Hraidmund/Raymond || also in the name of the Hreiðgoths. 
|-
|  hring, ring || ring ||  ||  (?)||  Hringuni, Rhincbold, Ringhelm, Hringweald, Hringolf ||  Förstemann 1900:877 suggests that the "ring" element in origin refers to ring-mail 
|-
|  hroc, roc || rook (bird)  ||  ||  ||  Ferderuchus, Unhroch, Wolfhroc; Rocbert, Hrohhart, Hrocculf, Ruocswint, Berthroc  ||  Förstemann 1900:878f. surmises an early conflation of two elements (1) hrauc "roar, bellow, (battle-)cry" and (2) rōc "care, circumspection", and both were further conflated with hrōþ- as first element, and with -rih as second.  As a second element since the 5th century. Crocus, the 4th-century king of the Alamanni, presumably had a name formed from this element, as did Rocco bishop of Autun (7th century) and  Rocho bishop of Bourges (8th century).
|-
|  hrom, hruom, rom ||  glory, fame  ||  ||— ||  Ruombald/Rumbold/Rombout, Rumbert, Ruumker, Hrumheri, Ruomlind, Romuald, Romulf  ||  since the 5th century; hypocorisms Ruom, Roma, Rumo. Förstemann 1900:883
|-
|| *hrōþ-; hruot ||  fame |||| || Hrothgar/Roger/Rüdiger, Hrodberht/Rupert/Robert, Hrodulf/Rudolph, Roderick, Roland, Rodney, Roald; Adalrod, Fridarut, Hartrod, Liutrod, Sigirod || 8th century; hypocorisms Chrodius, Hrodo, Hrodio, Hroda; Förstemann 1900:883
|-
| hug, hyg ||  spirit, courage  |||| || Hugibald/Ubaldo, Hygelac/Hyglac, Hugubert/Hubert, Hugibrant, Hucger, Hugilind; Adalhug, Kerhuge  ||

|-
|hun || swelling; chip, block; offspring, (bear) cub; warrior|||| || Hunferthus, Humboldt, Hunbeorht/Humbert; Andhun, Berthun; Ælfhun|| c.f. Hun of East Anglia
|-
|| ing || a god |||| || Inga, Ingeborg, Inger, Ingvar, Ingrid, Ingemar/Ingmar
|-
| irm(en), erm(en) || strong, whole ||  || ||  Eormenred, Ermenrich/Hermeric/Emmerich/Emery/Amerigo; Ermendrud/Ermintrude/Irmtrud, Ermenfrid, Ermengarde/Ermegard/Irmgard, Ermengild/Hermenegild, Ermenhild/Imelda || possibly theophoric, see Irminsul; hypocorisms Irma, Armin, Emma
|-
|ise(n) || iron ||  ||  || Isebert/Isebrecht, Isegrim/Isegrimm/Isengrim, Isenhart, IJsbrand || Isegrim may in origin have been a kenning for "wolf".
|-
|jut- || a tribal name ||  ||   || Judida, Judinga, Jutcar, Judilidis, Jutrad, Joduin, Judelhildis  ||  probably from the name of the Juthungi or the Jutes
|-
|jung || young ||  || || Jungarat, Jungericus, Jungulf, Jugenprand || 8th to 10th century, rare (used more rarely than ald- "old")
|-
|karl, carl, ceorl || man ||  ||  || Carlofred, Carlman; Altcarl, Gundecarl || rare; possibly extensions from the simplex.
|-
| *kōni-; cen, coen || fierce, keen |||| || Conrad/Konrad, Cynric, Coenwulf
|-
| *kun(n)i-, OHG kuni, chun, also chim, chin, chind; AS cyne || royal, of a king; kin, offspring, child |||| || Kunibert, Kunimund, Cynewulf, Kunigunde, Cynegyth, Cynethryth, Cyneric, Chindasuinth, Adelchind, Drudchind, Widukind, Willekind ||hypocorism Kuno, Chintila
|- 
| *kunþ-; cuþ ||  renowned |||| || Cuthbert, Cuthred, Cuthwulf
|-
| kwik-; cwic ||  alive, lively |||| || Cwichelm
|-
|laik || play, dance  ||  ||  ||  Ekkileich, Albleih, Amalleih, Ásleikr/Oslac, Audolecus, Perlaicus, Perahteih, Chinileihc, Dagaleich, Fridileih, Frotalaicus, Folcleih, Gozleih, Gundelaicus, Halulec, Hildelaicus, Hugilaih/Hyglac, Isanleih, Mathlec, Radleic, Sigelac, Wadelaicus, Walalaicho, Waldleich, Werinleih, Widolaic, Willileih, Winileih, Wolfleiga, Zitleich || possibly as first element in Leikert, Leuckart; Laigobert
|-
| laif, laf, leib ||  survivor, heir  || || ||Eggileib, Albleib, Olaf, Oslef, Athulef, Adalleib, Otleib, Berahtleib, Dagalaif, Danleib, Dotleib, Truhtleib, Edilef, Fridaleib, Folkleib, Guntaleiba, Hartleib, Haduleif, Herleif, Hiltileip, Hordleif, Hunleib, Isanleib, Mahtleip, Nordleip, Ortlaip, Ratleib, Reginleib, Richleib, Sileif, Starcleib, Thiotleip, Wiglaf, Wineleib, Wolleip, Wulfleip, Wunnileif, Zehaleip; Leibuni/Leiboin, Leibher, Leibhilt, Leibrat, Leibwart|| the probable original meaning "heir of"  suggests that this element at first appeared only as second element; it was from an early time it conflated with liub "dear". In Old Norse also used as a simplex, Leifr "heir".
|-
| laith || dangerous, hostile ||    || || Ansleth, Wolfleit; Leitbraht, Leitfrid, Leither, Leidmuot, Laidarat, Laidoin, Laidulf|| rare
|-
|land || land|| || ||Acland, Ingaland, Oslant, Osterlant, Auilant, Perelant, Perahtland, Cululant, Thruadland, Frotland, Gerland, Gotlanda, Grimland, Gundoland, Artaland, Hasland, Hiltiland, Hrodlant, Itislant, Inlant, Ermoland/Hermenland, Madoland, Meginland, Odallant, Ratland, Roland, Landon, Gagentland, Ricland, Sigilant, Wariland, Wiclant, Vulfland; Landolin, Landbold, Lambert/Landberta, Lampert, Landeberga, Lamprand, Lantbodo, Landfrid, Lampfrid, Landagar, Landegaus, Landgrim, Landegunda, Lantheida, Landohard, Lanthar, Landohildis, Landerich, Landswinda, Landoald, Landwih, Landuin, Landulf
|-
|laug || bride(?)|| ||   || Alblaug/Alflaug, Adallouc/Aðallaug, Ólaug, Árlaug, Arnlaug, Áslaug, Perahtlouc, Eyðleyg/Edlaug, Droplaug, Dýrlaug, Ellaug, Ercanloug,  Fastlaug, FInnlaug, Fridlaug, Grímlaug, Gerlaug, Gundlauc/Gunnlaug, Heiðlaug, Hiltilauc, Hrafnlaug, Íslaug, Jerlaug, Kristlaug,  Ratlauga, Róslaug,  Sigilouc/Siglaug, Sollaug, Sturlaug, Swanaloug/Svanlaug, Sveinlaug, Týlaugr, Triulaug, Vélaug, Wiglauh/Víglaugr, Þórlaug, Þraslaug || only as a suffix in feminine names; the suffix is presumably from a root *lug "to celebrate marriage; to be dedicated, promised (in marriage)"
|-
|lind || soft, mild, alternatively "shield" (made of linden tree) in ON, OHG and OE) || ||   ||  Gislinde, Heidelinde, Rosalint, Ermelind, Kristlind, Melinda, Odelinde, Siglind/Sieglinde, Theodolinda, Þórlindur; Linddís, Lindolf, Lindvald, Lindvardh, Linveig || very frequent as a second element in feminine names
|-
| liub, leof  || desirable, friendly || || || Leofric, Leofwine, Leofwynn
|-
|| liuti ||  people |||| || Liutger/Leodegar, Luther, Lutold; Liutgard, Liutwin, Luitpold/Leopold
|-
| magan, megin; maht ||  might, strength |||| ||Maganradus/Meinrad; Mathilde, Meinfrida, Meinhard
|-
| man, mann || man, person ||||||Manfred, Herman, German, Norman
|-
| *mēri-; mære, mer, mar, mir || famous ||||||Adelmar, Chlodomir, Marwig, Miro, Morgan, Filimer/Filimir, Hreiðmarr, Odomir/Otmar/Ottomar/Othmar/Ademar, Dietmar, Agilmar/Ilmar/Elmar, Ricimer, Richimir, Theodemir, Theodemar, Thiudimer, Sigmar, Ingemar/Ingmar, Valamir, Waldemar/Vladimir, Wilmer, Vidimir/Widemir, Wulfmar/Wulfomir
|-
|| mund ||  protection  || || || Edmund, Erlemund, Kunimund, Sigmund, Rechimund, Reginmund/Raymond, Remismund, Normund
|-
|niw, niwi, niu, nia || new ||  ||  || Adalniu, Baudonivia, Dagný, Folcniu, Nibumir, Nivulf, Niwirat, Niwirich, Odalniu, Signý/Sigeneow, Teudonivia
|-
|| noþ, OHG nand ||  courage  ||  || || Nanthild, Nothhelm; Byrhtnoth, Eadnoth, Ferdinand, Folcnand, Wieland/Wayland
|-
|-
|| ræð ||  counsel, wisdom  || || || Radegast, Radwig, Radulf; Alfred, Eadred, Conrad, Tancred, Wihtred; Ratberga/Redburga
|-
|ragin || counsel ||  || ||  Raginald/Reginald/Reynold/Reinhold/Reynhold/Ronald, Reginbert, Reginmund/Raymond; Regintrud, Rægenhere, Ragnar
|-
|*remez, remis || peace ||  || ||  Remisto, Remismund
|-
| run || rune, secret  || || || Gudrun, Walaruna
|-
|rīki-;  OHG rihhi, AS rīc || ruler  ||||||Rigobert, Alaric, Ælfric, Beorthric, Brunric, Theodoric/Dietrich, Friedrich/Frederick, Richard, Richardis, Rictrude, Richilda, Rechila, Rechiar, Rechimund, Richimir, Rickstan, Eboric, Ulrich, Haidrich/Heidrich, Leofric, Wulfric, Roderick, Sigeric, Sedrick, Cedric, Patrick, Chilperic, Theodoric, Henry/Heinrich, Eric, Godric
|-
|sax, seax || seax; a tribal name ||  || || Sexred; Seaxburh
|-
| sinþ, sind, siþ || travel, time ||||||Sindolf/Sindulf, Sindram, Sindbald, Sindbert; Adalsinda || Sinthgunt as "Sun's sister" in the Merseburg Incantations
|-
| sig, sigi, sige, sieg || victory  || || ||Sigborg/Siborg, Sigebald/Sibbald/Sibold, Sigbod/Sibot, Sigibert, Sibrand, Sigmar, Sigmund, Sighart, Sighelm, Sigher/Siger, Sigrad, Sigeric, Sigtrygg, Sigward/Siward, Sigfrid/Siegfried, Sigith/Sigita, Sigwald/Siwald, Sigulf/Sigewulf; Ælfsige; Sigelinde/Siglind, Sigtrud || possibly theophoric in origin, in reference to Teiwaz, and later Odin, the god of victory. Hypocorisms Sigo, Sike, Sikke.
|-
|| stan ||  stone  || || || Æthelstan, Thorsten, Wulfstan, Bertstan, Rickstan || also in simplex Sten, from Scandinavian Steinn|-
|swint, swiþ || strength ||  ||  || Swithwulf, Swinthibald; Amalaswintha, Ealhswith; Swinthila
|-
|tank || thought, counsel || || ||  Tancred/Dancrad, Dancmar
|-
|trygg || truth || |||| Sigtrygg
|-
|| Valdr || ruler, leader  || || ||  Ronald, Roald
|-
| wand, wandal || wander, wend  || || || Wandefrid, Wandedrudis (f.), Vandebercth (7th century), Wandemar, Wandarich, Wendulf, Wanthildis (f., 9th century); Wandalbold (8th century), Wandalbert (7th-9th centuries), Wandalburgis (f., 10th-11th centuries) ||in the names of the Vandals, Wends and Aurvandil 
|-
|| weald, Wald || power, brightness  ||  || || Waldemar/Vladimir, Walther; Edwald, Ewald, Frithuwold, Harold, Sigwald/Siwald, Gerald, Gundoald, Waldwolf/Waldolf/Adolf, Oswald/Ansaldo, Walfrid/Walfried
|-
|| warin; weard || guardian  ||  || || Warinhari/Wernher/Werner; Brunward, Edward, Sigward; Freawaru, Ælfwaru
|-
|wiht || wight, spirit ||  || || Wihtred
|-
|wil || will, desire ||  || || Wilhelm/William, Wilmer, Wilfred, Wilbert, Willihad, Willigip
|-
| win, wini, wine || friend || || || Winibald, Winimund, Winibert; Ælfwine/Alboin, Alcuin, Aldoin, Baldwin, Darwin, Ecgwine, Edwin/Audoin, Erlwin, Erwin, Gerwin, Goswin, Leofwine, Oswin
|-
|| wig ||  battle, war |||||| Wiglaf, Wigbert, Wigheard; Ludwig, Hedwig, Marwig
|-
|| wal(a), wel, wæl ||  battle |||| ||  Wieland/Wayland,  Walaman, Walarad, Walerand, Walaruna, Walesinda, Wala-anc, Walahelm, Walaram ||  hypochoristic Wallia, Walica.  c.f. Valhalla, Valkyrie, Valföðr etc. 
|-
|| wod (wad?)  || fury  |||| || Wodilhilt (f.), Wodalgarta (f.), Wodilbalt (a. 969), Wodalbert (a. 773), Wodelfrid (a. 912), Wodilulf (11th century), Vudamot (a. 821) || because of the close association with Wodanaz, these names are rare already in the OHG period, and fall out of use entirely during the High Middle Ages. Some hypocorisms such as Wote (a. 784), Woda (f., 8th century), Wodal (a. 889), Wode, Wodtke, may derive from this element. Wotan is recorded as a given name in the early 9th century. Association of most of these names with wod "fury" is uncertain, as there are the homophonic but unrelated roots of OHG watan "to wade" and wat "garment".
|-
|| wid(u), wit || wood, forest || || || Withhold, Widukind || hypocorism Guido, Guy
|-
| wulf || wolf  ||||||Aethelwulf/Adolf, Arnulf, Atenulf, Beowulf, Brunulf/Brynolf/Brunolf/Brynjolfr/Brunulphe, Cuthwulf, Cynewulf, Eadwulf, Ealdwulf/Aldwulf, Eardwulf, Ernulf, Gangolf, Gundulf, Pandulf, Swithwulf, Rudolph; Wulfstan, Wolfgang, Wolfram, Wulf (etc.) || Especially as second element,  -ulf, -olf is extremely common. Förstemann explains this as originally motivated by the wolf as an animal sacred to Wodanaz, but notes that the large number of names indicates that the element had become a meaningless suffix of male names at an early time. Förstemann counts 381 names in  -ulf, -olf, among which only four are feminine.  See also Offa (name)
|-
| wyn(n) || joy || || || Wynflæd; Ælfwynn, Ecgwynn, Brihtwyn
|-
|| þeod|| people |||| || Theodoric/Dietrich/Derick/Dirk, Detlef, Diether, Diethelm, Theobald,  Dietfried, Theudebert, Theodemar; Dietlinde
|-
| *þegnaz, degen || warrior, thane||||||  Degenhard, Degericus; Deitdegen, Edildegan,  Drûtdegan,  Heridegan,  Swertdegan, Volcdegen
|-
|| þryþ, 
OH þrúðr, OE þrȳð, drut, trud, thrud, thryth 
|  force, strength  || || || Drutmund; Æthelthryth, Osthryth, Cynethryth, Ermintrude, Gertrude, Bertrude, Rictrude, Sæthryth, Waltrud/Waltraut|| Names with this suffix are feminine only; Þrúðr is a daughter of Thor in Norse mythology. Short form Trudy, Trudi
|-
|| þonar, donar, þór ||   (the god of) thunder  || || (rare) || Donarperht (9th century), Donarad (8th century), Þórarin, Þórhall, Þórkell, Þórfinnr, Þórvald,  Þórvarðr, Þórgeir, Þórsteinn (9th century), Thunerulf/Þórolf ; Albthonar (8th century) || These names appear from the 8th or 9th century; popular in Scandinavia during the 10th to 11th centuries. Förstemann 1199.
|-
|| þurs, Thuris, Turis ||   giant  || ||  || Thusnelda (1st century; presumably for *Thurishilda), Thurismund (6th century), Thurisind (6th century), Turisulfus|| an archaic element in names of the migration period, extinct during the medieval period.  Förstemann 1200.
|}

Monothematic names
Some medieval Germanic names are attested in simplex form; these names originate as hypocorisms of full dithematic names, but in some cases they entered common usage and were no longer perceived as such.
 
Masculine: Aldo (whence English Aldous), Adel, Anso/Anzo/Enzo, Folki/Folke/Fulco, Gero, Helmo/Elmo, Ise/Iso, Kuno, Lanzo, Manno, Odo/Otto, Rocco, Sten, Waldo, Warin, Wido, Wine, Wolf/Wulf
Feminine: Adele, Alda, Bertha, Emma, Hilda, Ida, Isa, Linda, Oda

Some hypocorisms retain a remnant of their second element, but reduced so that it cannot be identified unambiguously any longer; Curt/Kurt may abbreviate either Conrad or Cunibert. Harry may abbreviate either Harold or Henry.

Other monothematic names originate as surnames (bynames) rather than hypocorisms of old dithematic names; e.g. Old English Æsc "ash tree", Carl "free man" (Charles), Hengest "stallion", Raban "raven" (Rabanus Maurus), Hagano/Hagen "enclosure", Earnest "vigorous, resolute".

Uncertain etymology
Gustav has been interpreted by e.g. Elof Hellquist (1864 - 1939) Swedish linguist specialist in North Germanic languages as gauta-stabaz (gauta-stabaR) "staff of the Geats"; it may also originate as an adaptation of the Slavic name Gostislav.
Old English Pǣga (unknown meaning)
Pepin
Morcar
Zotto
Cleph
Pemmo

 See also 

 Dutch name
 German name
 German family name etymology
 Scandinavian family name etymology
 Germanic placename etymology
 German placename etymology
 List of generic forms in British place names
 List of names of Odin
 Slavic names
 Germanic personal names in Galicia
Germanic names in Italy

References

 
Olof von Feilitzen, The Pre-conquest Personal Names of Domesday Book (1937).
E. Förstemann, Altdeutsches Namenbuch (1856; online facsimile)

Lena Peterson, Nordiskt runnamnslexikon, 4th ed. (2002);  5th ed. (2007).
 P. R. Kitson, (2002). How Anglo-Saxon personal names work. Nomina, 24, 93.
 F. C.  Robinson, (1968). The significance of names in old English literature. Anglia, 86, 14–58.
Justus Georg Schottel, De nominibus veterum Germanorum, in: Ausführliche Arbeit Von der Teutschen Haubt-Sprache, Zilliger (1663), book 5, chapter 2, pp. 1029–1098.
Franz Stark, Die Kosenamen der Germanen: eine Studie:  mit drei Excursen: 1. Über Zunamen; 2. Über den Ursprung der zusammengesetzten Namen; 3. Über besondere friesische Namensformen und Verkürzungen, 1868.
Friedrich Wilhelm Viehbeck, Die Namen der Alten teutschen: als Bilder ihres sittlichen und bürgerlichen Lebens (1818; online facsimile)
 H. B. Woolf, (1939). The old Germanic principles of name-giving. Baltimore: Johns Hopkins University Press.
 H. C. Wyld, (1910). Old Scandinavian personal names in England. Modern Language Review, 5, 289–296.
 Charlotte Mary Yonge, History of Christian names'', vol. 2, Parker and Bourn, 1863.

External links

Germanic names (behindthename.com)
Ancient Germanic names (behindthename.com)
Gothic and Suevic Names in Galicia (NW Spain) before 1200 (celtiberia.net)
Nordic Names: Name Elements (nordicnames.de)
Ancient Germanic Names (kurufin.ru, in Russian)